East Lothian Council is one of the 32 local government councils in Scotland covering the East Lothian area. Since the last boundary changes in 2017, 22 councillors have been elected from 6 wards.

History
East Lothian District Council had been created in 1975 under the Local Government (Scotland) Act 1973, as one of four districts within the Lothian region (along with Edinburgh, Midlothian and West Lothian, each having some differences from the territory of their corresponding historic counties). All four districts of Lothian became single tier local authorities in 1996, under the Local Government etc. (Scotland) Act 1994, when the council adopted its current name as East Lothian Council.

Political control
The first election to the East Lothian District Council was held in 1974, initially operating as a shadow authority alongside the outgoing authorities until the new system came into force on 16 May 1975. A shadow authority was again elected in 1995 ahead of the reforms which came into force on 1 April 1996. Political control of the council since 1975 has been as follows:

East Lothian District Council

East Lothian Council

Leadership
The leaders of the council since 2007 have been:

Elections

Since 2007 elections have been held every five years under the single transferable vote system, introduced by the Local Governance (Scotland) Act 2004. Election results since 1995 have been as follows:

Premises
The council is based at John Muir House, Haddington, which forms a modern extension to the County Buildings, Haddington, which had been the headquarters of the pre-1975 East Lothian County Council. Council meetings are held at Haddington Town House.

Wards

References

Local authorities of Scotland
Politics of East Lothian
Organisations based in East Lothian
Haddington, East Lothian